The 1980 Cal State Fullerton Titans football team represented California State University, Fullerton as a member of the Pacific Coast Athletic Association (PCAA) during the 1980 NCAA Division I-A football season. Led by first-year head coach Gene Murphy, Cal State Fullerton compiled an overall record of 4–7 with a mark of 1–4 in conference play, placing in a three-way tie for fourth place in the PCAA. The Titans played two home games for the third year in a row, both at Titan Field on the Cal State Fullerton campus. The football team shared the stadium with the Cal State Fullerton Titans baseball from 1980 to 1982.

Schedule

Team players in the NFL
The following Cal State Fullerton Titans were selected in the 1981 NFL Draft.

References

Cal State Fullerton
Cal State Fullerton Titans football seasons
Cal State Fullerton Titans football